Fire: Ungh's Quest, also known simply as Fire, is an point and click puzzle game produced by German developer Daedalic Entertainment. The game was initially released for Windows on April 9, 2015. It was later released for Wii U on October 20, 2016, and for Nintendo Switch on May 12, 2021. The game received mixed reviews. Some of the negative points mentioned were the exaggerated ease of quests and the short duration of the game.

Gameplay 
The player controls a Neanderthal called Ungh. He was responsible for guarding the village flame, however, on his first night of work, the fire fizzles out, and because of that, Ungh is banned from the village. The protagonist's objective is to find the fire to return to his village. The game is made up of ten scenarios. To advance in level, the player must solve the puzzles.

Reception 

The game received mixed reviews, reaching 64 points on Metacritic in the PC version, based on 15 critic reviews. Jose A. Rodríguez, from IGN España, praised the game's graphic art and soundtrack, however, he pointed out as negative points the lack of dialogues, the excessive ease to complete the levels and the short duration of the game. Liam Doolan of Nintendo Life also praised the graphics but wrote that the game has an insipid offer: "Right down to the name, it makes little effort to stand out from the crowd".

Awards

References 

2017 video games
Fiction about neanderthals
Nintendo Switch games
Puzzle video games
Point-and-click adventure games
Video games developed in Germany
Video games set in prehistory
Wii U games
Windows games